Jucancistrocerus is a Palearctic genus of potter wasps. The currently species assigned to Jucancistrocerus are:

 Jucancistrocerus alashanicus Kurzenko, 1977
 Jucancistrocerus angustifrons (Kostylev, 1940) 
 Jucancistrocerus atrofasciatus (Moravitz, 1885) 
 Jucancistrocerus caspicus Giordani Soika, 1970
 Jucancistrocerus chotanensis (Blüthgen, 1942) 
 Jucancistrocerus citreodecoratus Giordani Soika, 1970
 Jucancistrocerus consimilis (Moravitz, 1895)
 Jucancistrocerus inusiatus Gusenleitner, 1999
 Jucancistrocerus jucundus (Mocsáry, 1883)
 Jucancistrocerus lepidus Gusenleitner, 1972
 Jucancistrocerus minutepunctatus Giordani Soika, 1970
 Jucancistrocerus pareumeniformis Giordani Soika, 1973
 Jucancistrocerus saharensis (Giordani Soika, 1934)
 Jucancistrocerus subnitens (Moravitz, 1895)
 Jucancistrocerus tachkendensis (Dalla Torre, 1889)

References

 Vecht, J.v.d. & J.M. Carpenter. 1990. A Catalogue of the genera of the Vespidae (Hymenoptera). Zoologische Verhandelingen 260: 3 - 62.

Biological pest control wasps
Potter wasps